The 1825 Indiana gubernatorial election took place on August 1, 1825, under the provisions of the Constitution of Indiana. It was the fourth gubernatorial election in the State of Indiana. James B. Ray, the incumbent governor following the resignation of William Hendricks, was reelected to a full term, defeating Isaac Blackford, the chief justice of the Indiana Supreme Court. The election took place concurrently with elections for lieutenant governor and members of the Indiana General Assembly.

William Hendricks won the 1822 Indiana gubernatorial election without facing any significant opposition and remains the only governor of Indiana to be elected unanimously. Rather than seek reelection to a second three-year term, Hendricks ran for the United States Senate and was elected on the fourth ballot of the General Assembly by a narrow majority of two votes. He formally resigned the governorship on February 12, 1825, the last day of the state legislative session. As the elected lieutenant governor, Ratliff Boon, had resigned his office the previous year following his election to the United States House of Representatives, the president pro tempore of the Indiana Senate, James B. Ray, became acting governor.

There was some controversy as to whether Ray could lawfully continue as governor for the remainder of Hendricks' term, with some arguing he must forfeit the office following the end of his senatorial term in August. Others questioned whether Ray, who was a few days shy of thirty when Hendricks resigned, was constitutionally eligible to serve as governor. Article IV§4 of the Indiana Constitution required the governor be "at least thirty years of age, and shall have been a citizen of the united States ten years, and have resided in the State five years next preceding his Election." A Richmond paper asserted Ray was only twenty-eight years old and described his ascension as "an usurpation, which should not be tolerated by the people of the state". The issue of Ray's age and the legality of his governorship persisted as the 1825 gubernatorial campaign commenced.

Despite the bitterly polarizing presidential election only the previous year, the campaign was conducted on a nonpartisan basis. Ray announced his candidacy in May and received the support of the Indianapolis Gazette and other newspapers, who praised his legislative experience, humility, and diligence. In addition to Ray, Chief Justice Blackford, Justices Jesse Lynch Holman and James Scott of the state supreme court, and State Representative David H. Maxwell were mentioned as potential candidates. By spring, Blackford has emerged as the main opposition to Ray. Both campaigns praised their candidate's experience and moral attributes, while disparaging their opponent as a craven office-seeker. While Blackford was rebuked for seeking the governorship while serving on the state supreme court, Ray came under criticism for campaigning for a seat in Congress while still a member of the State Senate in 1824. Both campaigns likewise sought to portray their candidate as a man of the people, in contrast to the opponent's perceived elitism. Blackford was endorsed by the Indiana Journal, whose editor nevertheless conceded Ray had competently carried out his duties as acting governor, while there were few important policy differences between the candidates.

Results
Ray defeated Blackford decisively, polling strongest in the eastern counties. The county returns, provided below, are incomplete: in his inaugural message to the General Assembly, Ray noted that eleven communities had failed to make returns for the gubernatorial election.

Results by county

Notes

References

Bibliography

Political history of Indiana
1816